Bucharest is the capital and largest city of Romania. It is described as the cultural, financial, entertainment, and media center in the country with a significant influence in Eastern and Southeastern Europe as well. It is also a city with a significant influence in terms of education, tourism, research, technology, health care, art, fashion, sports, and politics. It is also one of the most populated cities of the European Union (EU) within city limits and the most populated capital in Southeastern Europe. It was the capital of Wallachia from 1659 to 1859 and the capital of the United Principalities of Moldavia and Wallachia (Romanian United Principalities, later the Kingdom of Romania) from 1859 to 1881.

Bucharest was first mentioned in documents in 1459. The city became capital in 1862 and is the centre of Romanian media, culture, and art. Its architecture is a mix of historical (mostly Eclectic, but also Neoclassical and Art Nouveau), interbellum (Bauhaus, Art Deco, and Romanian Revival architecture), socialist era, and modern. In the period between the two World Wars, the city's elegant architecture and the sophistication of its elite earned Bucharest the nicknames of Little Paris or Paris of the East. Although buildings and districts in the historic city centre were heavily damaged or destroyed by war, earthquakes, and even Nicolae Ceaușescu's program of systematization, many survived and have been renovated. In recent years, the city has been experiencing an economic and cultural boom. It is one of the fastest-growing high-tech cities in Europe, according to the Financial Times, CBRE, TechCrunch, and others. UiPath, a global startup founded in Bucharest, has reached over $60 billion in valuation. Bucharest hosts the largest high tech summit in South-Eastern Europe,  Romania Blockchain Summit.

In 2016, the historical city centre was listed as 'endangered' by the World Monuments Watch.<ref
name="wmf.org"></ref> In 2017, Bucharest was the European city with the highest growth of tourists who stay over night, according to the Mastercard Global Index of Urban Destinations. As for the past two consecutive years, 2018 and 2019, Bucharest ranked as the European destination with the highest potential for development according to the same study.

According to the 2022 census, 1,716,983 inhabitants live within the city limits. Adding the satellite towns around the urban area, the proposed metropolitan area of Bucharest would have a population of 2.26 million people. In 2020, the government used 2.5 million people as the basis for pandemic reports. Bucharest is the eighth largest city in the European Union by population within city limits, after Hamburg from Germany and before Budapest, Hungary.

Economically, Bucharest is the most prosperous city in Romania and the richest capital and city in the region, surpassing Budapest a few years ago. By 2050, certain economic studies reveal the fact that Bucharest will emerge as Europe's richest city in terms of GDP per capita, followed by Luxembourg City and Groningen. Furthermore, a new report by Grosvenor, revealed that Bucharest will already be the 3rd richest city in Europe by 2040.

The city has a number of large convention facilities, educational institutes, cultural venues, traditional 'shopping arcades' and recreational areas.

The city proper is administratively known as the 'Municipality of Bucharest', and has the same administrative level as that of a national county, being further subdivided into six sectors, each governed by a local mayor.

Etymology 

The Romanian name București has an unverified origin. Tradition connects the founding of Bucharest with the name of Bucur, who was a prince, an outlaw, a fisherman, a shepherd or a hunter, according to different legends. In Romanian, the word stem bucurie means 'joy' ('happiness'), and it is believed to be of Dacian origin, hence the city Bucharest means 'city of joy'.

Other etymologies are given by early scholars, including the one of an Ottoman traveller, Evliya Çelebi, who said that Bucharest was named after a certain 'Abu-Kariș', from the tribe of 'Bani-Kureiș'. In 1781, Austrian historian Franz Sulzer claimed that it was related to bucurie (joy), bucuros (joyful), or a se bucura (to be joyful), while an early 19th-century book published in Vienna assumed its name to be derived from 'Bukovie', a beech forest. In English, the city's name was formerly rendered as Bukarest. A native or resident of Bucharest is called a 'Bucharester' (Romanian: bucureștean).

History 

Bucharest's history alternated periods of development and decline from the early settlements in antiquity until its consolidation as the national capital of Romania late in the 19th century. First mentioned as the 'Citadel of București' in 1459, it became the residence of the ruler of Wallachia, Voivode Vlad the Impaler.

The Ottomans appointed Greek administrators (Phanariotes) to run the town from the 18th century. The 1821 Wallachian uprising initiated by Tudor Vladimirescu led to the end of the rule of Constantinople Greeks in Bucharest.

The Old Princely Court (Curtea Veche) was erected by Mircea Ciobanul in the mid-16th century. Under subsequent rulers, Bucharest was established as the summer residence of the royal court. During the years to come, it competed with Târgoviște on the status of capital city after an increase in the importance of Southern Muntenia brought about by the demands of the suzerain power – the Ottoman Empire.

Bucharest finally became the permanent location of the Wallachian court after 1698 (starting with the reign of Constantin Brâncoveanu).

Partly destroyed by natural disasters and rebuilt several times during the following 200 years, and hit by Caragea's plague in 1813–14, the city was wrested from Ottoman control and occupied at several intervals by the Habsburg monarchy (1716, 1737, 1789) and Imperial Russia (three times between 1768 and 1806). It was placed under Russian administration between 1828 and the Crimean War, with an interlude during the Bucharest-centred 1848 Wallachian revolution. Later, an Austrian garrison took possession after the Russian departure (remaining in the city until March 1857). On 23 March 1847, a fire consumed about 2,000 buildings, destroying a third of the city. 

In 1862, after Wallachia and Moldavia were united to form the Principality of Romania, Bucharest became the new nation's capital city. In 1881, it became the political centre of the newly proclaimed Kingdom of Romania under King Carol I. During the second half of the 19th century, the city's population increased dramatically, and a new period of urban development began. During this period, gas lighting, horse-drawn trams, and limited electrification were introduced. The Dâmbovița River was also massively channelled in 1883, thus putting a stop to previously endemic floods like the 1865 flooding of Bucharest. The Fortifications of Bucharest were built. The extravagant architecture and cosmopolitan high culture of this period won Bucharest the nickname of 'Paris of the East' (Parisul Estului), with the Calea Victoriei as its Champs-Élysées. 

Between 6 December 1916 and November 1918, the city was occupied by German forces as a result of the Battle of Bucharest, with the official capital temporarily moved to Iași (also called Jassy), in the Moldavia region. After World War I, Bucharest became the capital of Greater Romania. In the interwar years, Bucharest's urban development continued, with the city gaining an average of 30,000 new residents each year. Also, some of the city's main landmarks were built in this period, including Arcul de Triumf and Palatul Telefoanelor. However, the Great Depression in Romania took its toll on Bucharest's citizens, culminating in the Grivița Strike of 1933.

In January 1941, the city was the scene of the Legionnaires' rebellion and Bucharest pogrom. As the capital of an Axis country and a major transit point for Axis troops en route to the Eastern Front, Bucharest suffered heavy damage during World War II due to Allied bombings. On 23 August 1944, Bucharest was the site of the royal coup which brought Romania into the Allied camp. The city suffered a short period of Nazi Luftwaffe bombings, as well as a failed attempt by German troops to regain the city.

After the establishment of communism in Romania, the city continued growing. New districts were constructed, most of them dominated by tower blocks. During Nicolae Ceaușescu's leadership (1965–89), a part of the historic part of the city was demolished and replaced by 'Socialist realism' style development: (1) the Centrul Civic (the Civic Centre) and (2) the Palace of the Parliament, for which an entire historic quarter was razed to make way for Ceaușescu's megalomaniac plans.

The Romanian Revolution of 1989 began with massive anti-Ceaușescu protests in Timișoara in December 1989 and continued in Bucharest, leading to the overthrow of the Communist regime. Dissatisfied with the postrevolutionary leadership of the National Salvation Front, some student leagues and opposition groups organised anti-Communist rallies in early 1990, which caused the political change.

Since 2000, the city has been continuously modernised. Residential and commercial developments are underway, particularly in the northern districts; Bucharest's old historic centre has undergone restoration since the mid-2000s.

In 2015, 64 people were killed in the Colectiv nightclub fire. Later the Romanian capital saw the 2017–2019 Romanian protests against the judicial reforms, with a 2018 protest ending with 450 people injured.

Treaties 
The following treaties were  signed in the city:
 Treaty of Bucharest (1812), between the Ottoman Empire and the Russian Empire ending the Russo-Turkish War (1806–1812)
 Treaty of Bucharest (1886), between Serbia and Bulgaria ending the Serbian–Bulgarian War
 Treaty of Bucharest (1913), between Bulgaria, Romania, Serbia, Montenegro and Greece ending of the Second Balkan War
 Treaty of Bucharest (1916), a treaty of alliance between Romania and the Entente Powers
 Treaty of Bucharest (1918), between Romania and the Central Powers

Geography

General 
 
The city is situated on the banks of the Dâmbovița River, which flows into the Argeș River, a tributary of the Danube. Several lakesthe most important of which are Lake Herăstrău, Lake Floreasca, Lake Tei, and Lake Colentinastretch across the northern parts of the city, along the Colentina River, a tributary of the Dâmbovița. In addition, in the centre of the capital is a small artificial lakeLake Cișmigiusurrounded by the Cișmigiu Gardens. These gardens have a rich history, having been frequented by poets and writers. Opened in 1847 and based on the plans of German architect Carl F.W. Meyer, the gardens are the main recreational facility in the city centre.

Bucharest parks and gardens also include Herăstrău Park, Tineretului Park and the Botanical Garden. Herăstrău Park is located in the northern part of the city, around Lake Herăstrău, and includes the site the Village Museum. Grigore Antipa Museum is also near in the Victoriei Square. One of its best known locations are Hard Rock Cafe Bucharest and Berăria H (one of the largest beer halls in Europe). Tineretului Park was created in 1965 and designed as the main recreational space for southern Bucharest. It contains a Mini Town which is a play area for kids. The Botanical Garden, located in the Cotroceni neighbourhood a bit west of the city centre, is the largest of its kind in Romania and contains over 10,000 species of plants (many of them exotic); it originated as the pleasure park of the royal family. Besides them, there are many other smaller parks that should be visited, some of them being still large. Alexandru Ioan Cuza Park, Kiseleff Park, Carol Park, Izvor Park, Grădina Icoanei, Circului Park and Moghioroș Park are a few of them. Other large parks in Bucharest are: National Park, Tei Park, Eroilor Park and Crângași Park with Morii Lake.

Lake Văcărești is located in the southern part of the city. Over 190 hectares, including 90 hectares of water, host 97 species of birds, half of them protected by law, and at least seven species of mammals. The lake is surrounded by buildings of flats and is an odd result of human intervention and nature taking its course. The area was a small village that Ceaușescu attempted to convert into a lake. After demolishing the houses and building the concrete basin, the plan was abandoned following the 1989 revolution. For nearly two decades, the area shifted from being an abandoned green space where children could play and sunbathe, to being contested by previous owners of the land there, to being closed for redevelopment into a sports centre. The redevelopment deal failed, and over the following years, the green space grew into a unique habitat. In May 2016, the lake was declared a national park, the Văcărești Nature Park. Dubbed the 'Delta of Bucharest', the area is protected. 

Bucharest is situated in the center of the Romanian Plain, in an area once covered by the Vlăsiei Forest, which after it was cleared, gave way for a fertile flatland. As with many cities, Bucharest is traditionally considered to be built upon seven hills, similar to the seven hills of Rome. Bucharest's seven hills are: Mihai Vodă, Dealul Mitropoliei, Radu Vodă, Cotroceni, Dealul Spirii, Văcărești, and Sfântu Gheorghe Nou.

The city has a roughly round shape, with the centre situated in the cross-way of the main north–south/east-west axes at University Square. The milestone for Romania's Kilometre Zero is placed just south of University Square in front of the New St. George Church (Sfântul Gheorghe Nou) at St. George Square (Piața Sfântul Gheorghe).

Until recently, the regions surrounding Bucharest were largely rural, but after 1989, suburbs started to be built around Bucharest, in the surrounding Ilfov County. Further urban consolidation is expected to take place in the late 2010s, when the 'Bucharest Metropolitan Area' plan will become operational, incorporating additional communes and cities from the Ilfov and other neighbouring counties.

Climate 

Bucharest has a humid continental climate (Dfa/Dfb by the 0 °C isotherm), or a humid subtropical climate (Köppen: Cfa by the -3 °C isotherm), with hot, humid summers and cold, snowy winters. Owing to its position on the Romanian Plain, the city's winters can get windy, though some of the winds are mitigated due to urbanisation. Temperatures frequently reach  in midsummer in the city centre. Although average precipitation and humidity during summer are low, occasional heavy storms occur.

Government

Administration  

Bucharest has a unique status in Romanian administration, since it is the only municipal area that is not part of a county. Its population, however, is larger than that of any other Romanian county, hence the power of the Bucharest General Municipality (Primăria Generală), which is the capital's local government body, is the same as any other Romanian county council.

The Municipality of Bucharest, along with the surrounding Ilfov County, is part of the București – Ilfov development region project, which is equivalent to NUTS-II regions in the European Union and is used both by the EU and the Romanian government for statistical analysis, and to co-ordinate regional development projects and manage funds from the EU. The Bucharest-Ilfov development region is not, however, an administrative entity yet.

The city government is headed by a general mayor (Primar General). Since 29 October 2020 onwards, it is Nicușor Dan, currently an independent politician previously backed by the PNL-USR PLUS centre-right alliance at the 2020 Romanian local elections. Decisions are approved and discussed by the capital's General Council (Consiliu General) made up of 55 elected councilors. Furthermore, the city is divided into six administrative sectors (sectoare), each of which has its own 27-seat sectoral council, town hall, and mayor. The powers of the local government over a certain area are, therefore, shared both by the Bucharest municipality and the local sectoral councils with little or no overlapping of authority. The general rule is that the main capital municipality is responsible for citywide utilities such as the water and sewage system, the overall transport system, and the main boulevards, while sectoral town halls manage the contact between individuals and the local government, secondary streets and parks maintenance, schools administration, and cleaning services.

The six sectors are numbered from one to six and are disposed radially so that each one has under its administration a certain area of the city centre. They are numbered clockwise and are further divided into sectoral quarters (cartiere) which are not part of the official administrative division:
Sector 1 (population 227,717): Dorobanți, Băneasa, Aviației, Pipera, Aviatorilor, Primăverii, Romană, Victoriei, Herăstrău Park, Bucureștii Noi, Dămăroaia, Străulești, Grivița, 1 Mai, Băneasa Forest, Pajura, Domenii, Chibrit
Sector 2 (population 357,338): Pantelimon, Colentina, Iancului, Tei, Floreasca, Moșilor, Obor, Vatra Luminoasă, Fundeni, Plumbuita, Ștefan cel Mare, Baicului
Sector 3 (population 399,231): Vitan, Dudești, Titan, Centrul Civic, Dristor, Lipscani, Muncii, Unirii
Sector 4 (population 300,331): Berceni, Olteniței, Giurgiului, Progresul, Văcărești, Timpuri Noi, Tineretului
Sector 5 (population 288,690): Rahova, Ferentari, Giurgiului, Cotroceni, 13 Septembrie, Dealul Spirii
Sector 6 (population 371,060): Giulești, Crângași, Drumul Taberei, Militari, Grozăvești (also known as Regie), Ghencea 

Each sector is governed by a local mayor, as follows: Sector 1 – Clotilde Armand (USR, since 2020), Sector 2 – Radu Mihaiu (USR, since 2020), Sector 3 – Robert Negoiță (PRO B, since 2012), Sector 4 – Daniel Băluță (PSD, since 2016), Sector 5 – Cristian Popescu Piedone (PPU SL, since 2020), Sector 6 – Ciprian Ciucu (PNL, since 2020).

Like all other local councils in Romania, the Bucharest sectoral councils, the capital's general council, and the mayors are elected every four years by the population. Additionally, Bucharest has a prefect, who is appointed by Romania's national government. The prefect is not allowed to be a member of a political party and his role is to represent the national government at the municipal level. The prefect is acting as a liaison official facilitating the implementation of national development plans and governing programs at local level. The prefect of Bucharest (as of 2021) is Alexandra Văcaru.

City general council 

The city's general council has the following political composition, based on the results of the 2020 local elections:

Justice system 

Bucharest's judicial system is similar to that of the Romanian counties. Each of the six sectors has its own local first-instance court (judecătorie), while more serious cases are directed to the Bucharest Tribunal (Tribunalul Bucureşti), the city's municipal court. The Bucharest Court of Appeal (Curtea de Apel Bucureşti) judges appeals against decisions taken by first-instance courts and tribunals in Bucharest and in five surrounding counties (Teleorman, Ialomița, Giurgiu, Călărași, and Ilfov). Bucharest is also home to Romania's supreme court, the High Court of Cassation and Justice, as well as to the Constitutional Court of Romania.

Bucharest has a municipal police force, the Bucharest Police (Poliția București), which is responsible for policing crime within the whole city, and operates a number of divisions. The Bucharest Police are headquartered on Ștefan cel Mare Blvd. in the city centre, and at precincts throughout the city. From 2004 onwards, each sector city hall also has under its administration a community police force (Poliția Comunitară), dealing with local community issues. Bucharest also houses the general inspectorates of the Gendarmerie and the national police.

Crime 

Bucharest's crime rate is rather low in comparison to other European capital cities, with the number of total offences declining by 51% between 2000 and 2004, and by 7% between 2012 and 2013. The violent crime rate in Bucharest remains very low, with 11 murders and 983 other violent offences taking place in 2007. Although violent crimes fell by 13% in 2013 compared to 2012, 19 murders (18 of which the suspects were arrested) were recorded.

Although in the 2000s, a number of police crackdowns on organised crime gangs occurred, such as the Cămătaru clan, organised crime generally has little impact on public life. Petty crime, however, is more common, particularly in the form of pickpocketing, which occurs mainly on the city's public transport network. Confidence tricks were common in the 1990s, especially in regards to tourists, but the frequency of these incidents has since declined. However, in general, theft was reduced by 13.6% in 2013 compared to 2012. Levels of crime are higher in the southern districts of the city, particularly in Ferentari, a socially disadvantaged area.

Although the presence of street children was a problem in Bucharest in the 1990s, their numbers have declined in recent years, now lying at or below the average of major European capital cities.

Quality of life 

As stated by the Mercer international surveys for quality of life in cities around the world, Bucharest occupied the 94th place in 2001 and slipped lower, to the 108th place in 2009 and the 107th place in 2010. Compared to it, Vienna occupied number one worldwide in 2011 and 2009. Warsaw ranked 84th, Istanbul 112th, and neighbours Sofia 114th and Belgrade 136th (in the 2010 rankings).

Mercer Human Resource Consulting issues yearly a global ranking of the world's most livable cities based on 39 key quality-of-life issues. Among them: political stability, currency-exchange regulations, political and media censorship, school quality, housing, the environment, and public safety. Mercer collects data worldwide, in 215 cities. The difficult situation of the quality of life in Bucharest is confirmed also by a vast urbanism study, done by the Ion Mincu University of Architecture and Urbanism.

In 2016, Bucharest's urban situation was described as 'critical' by a Romanian Order of Architects (OAR) report that criticised the city's weak, incoherent and arbitrary public management policies, its elected officials' lack of transparency and public engagement, as well as its inadequate and unsustainable use of essential urban resources.
Bucharest's historical city centre is listed as 'endangered' by the World Monuments Watch (as of 2016).

Although many neighbourhoods, particularly in the southern part of the city, lack sufficient green space, being formed of cramped, high-density blocks of flats, Bucharest also has many parks.

Demographics 

As per the 2022 census, 1,716,983 inhabitants lived within the city limits, a decrease from the figure recorded at the 2011 census. This decrease is due to low natural increase, but also to a shift in population from the city itself to its smaller satellite towns such as Voluntari, Buftea, and Otopeni. In a study published by the United Nations, Bucharest placed 19th among 28 cities that recorded sharp declines in population from 1990 to the mid-2010s. In particular, the population fell by 3.77%.

The city's population, according to the 2002 census, was 1,926,334 inhabitants, or 8.9% of the total population of Romania. A significant number of people commute to the city every day, mostly from the surrounding Ilfov County, but official statistics regarding their numbers do not exist.

Bucharest's population experienced two phases of rapid growth, the first beginning in the late 19th century when the city was consolidated as the national capital and lasting until the Second World War, and the second during the Ceaușescu years (1965–1989), when a massive urbanization campaign was launched and many people migrated from rural areas to the capital. At this time, due to Ceaușescu's decision to ban abortion and contraception, natural increase was also significant.

Bucharest is a city of high population density: 8,260/km2 (21,400/sq mi), owing to the fact that most of the population lives in high-density communist era apartment blocks (blocuri). However, this also depends on the part of the city: the southern boroughs have a higher density than the northern ones. Of the European Union country capital-cities, only Paris and Athens have a higher population density (see List of European Union cities proper by population density).

About 97.3% of the population of Bucharest for whom data are available is Romanian. Other significant ethnic groups are Romani, Hungarians, Turks, Jews, Germans (mostly Regat Germans), Chinese, Russians, Ukrainians, and Italians. A relatively small number of Bucharesters are also Greeks, Armenians, Bulgarians, Albanians, Poles,  French, Arabs, Africans (including the Afro-Romanians), Vietnamese, Filipinos, Nepalis, Afghans, Sri Lankans, Bangladeshis, Pakistanis, and Indians. 226,943 people did not declare their ethnicity.

In terms of religious affiliation, 96.1% of the population for whom data are available is Romanian Orthodox, 1.2% is Roman Catholic, 0.5% is Muslim, and 0.4% is Romanian Greek Catholic. Despite this, only 18% of the population, of any religion, attends a place of worship once a week or more. The life expectancy of residents of Bucharest in 2015 was 77.8 years old, which is 2.4 years above the national average.

Economy 

Bucharest is the centre of the Romanian economy and industry, accounting for around 24% (2017) of the country's GDP and about one-quarter of its industrial production, while being inhabited by 9% of the country's population. Almost one-third of national taxes is paid by Bucharest's citizens and companies. The living standard in the Bucharest-Ilfov region was 145% of the EU average in 2017, according to GDP per capita at the purchasing power parity standard (adjusted to the national price level).

Bucharest area surpassed, on comparable terms, European metropolitan areas such as Budapest (139%), Madrid (125%), Berlin (118%), Rome (110%), Lisbon (102%), or Sofia (79%), and more than twice the Romanian average. After relative stagnation in the 1990s, the city's strong economic growth has revitalised infrastructure and led to the development of shopping malls, residential estates, and high-rise office buildings. In January 2013, Bucharest had an unemployment rate of 2.1%, significantly lower than the national unemployment rate of 5.8%.

Bucharest's economy is centred on industry and services, with services particularly growing in importance in the last 10 years. The headquarters of 186,000 firms, including nearly all large Romanian companies, are located in Bucharest. An important source of growth since 2000 has been the city's rapidly expanding property and construction sector. Bucharest is also Romania's largest centre for information technology and communications and is home to several software companies operating offshore delivery centres. Romania's largest stock exchange, the Bucharest Stock Exchange, which was merged in December 2005 with the Bucharest-based electronic stock exchange Rasdaq, plays a major role in the city's economy.

International supermarket chains such as Kaufland, Lidl, Metro, Selgros, Penny Market, Carrefour, Auchan, Cora, Profi, and Mega Image are all operating in Bucharest. The city is undergoing a retail boom. Bucharest hosts luxury brands such as Armani, Versace, Ralph Lauren, Dior, Prada, Chanel, Hermes, Louis Vuitton, and Gucci. Malls and large shopping centres have been built since the late 1990s, such as Băneasa Shopping City, AFI Palace Cotroceni, Mega Mall, București Mall, ParkLake Shopping Centre, Sun Plaza, Promenada Mall and longest Unirea Shopping Centre. Bucharest has over 20 malls as of 2019.

The corporations Amazon, Microsoft, Ubisoft, Oracle Corporation, or IBM are all present in the Romanian capital. The top ten is also dominated by companies operating in automotive, oil & gas (such as Petrom), as well as companies in telecommunication and FMCG.

Transport  
Bucharest is crossed by two major international routes: Pan-European transport corridor IV and IX.

Public transport   

Bucharest's public transport system is the largest in Romania and one of the largest in Europe. It is made up of the Bucharest Metro, run by Metrorex, as well as a surface transport system run by STB (Societatea de Transport București, previously known as the RATB), which consists of buses, trams, trolleybuses, and light rail. In addition, a private minibus system operates there. , a limit of 10,000 taxicab licences was imposed.

Railways 
It is the hub of Romania's national railway network, run by Căile Ferate Române. The main railway station is Gara de Nord ('North Station'), which provides connections to all major cities in Romania, as well as international destinations: Belgrade, Sofia, Varna, Chișinău, Kyiv, Chernivtsi, Lviv, Thessaloniki, Vienna, Budapest, Istanbul, Moscow etc.

The city has five other railway stations run by CFR, of which the most important are Basarab (adjacent to North Station), Obor, Băneasa, and Progresul. These are in the process of being integrated into a commuter railway serving Bucharest and the surrounding Ilfov County. Seven main lines radiate out of Bucharest.

The oldest station in Bucharest is Filaret. It was inaugurated in 1869, and in 1960, the communist government turned it in a bus terminal.

Air   
It is the busiest airport in Romania, in terms of passenger traffic: 12,807,032 in 2017.
 Aurel Vlaicu International Airport (IATA: BBU, ICAO: LRBS) is Bucharest's business and VIP airport.

Roads  
Bucharest is a major intersection of Romania's national road network. A few of the busiest national roads and motorways link the city to all of Romania's major cities, as well as to neighbouring countries such as Hungary, Bulgaria and Ukraine. The A1 to Pitești, and from Sibiu to the Hungarian border, the A2 Sun Motorway to the Dobrogea region and Constanța, and the A3 to Ploiești all start from Bucharest.

A series of high-capacity boulevards, which generally radiate out from the city centre to the outskirts, provides a framework for the municipal road system. The main axes, which run north–south, east–west and northwest–southeast, as well as one internal and one external ring road, support the bulk of the traffic.

The city's roads are usually very crowded during rush hours, due to an increase in car ownership in recent years. In 2013, the number of cars registered in Bucharest amounted to 1,125,591. This results in wear and potholes appearing on busy roads, particularly secondary roads, this being identified as one of Bucharest's main infrastructural problems. A comprehensive effort on behalf of the City Hall to boost road infrastructure was made, and according to the general development plan, 2,000 roads have been repaired by 2008. The huge number of cars registered in the city forced the Romanian Auto Registry to switch to 3-digit numbers on registration plates in 2010.

On 17 June 2011, the Basarab Overpass was inaugurated and opened to traffic, thus completing the inner city traffic ring. The overpass took five years to build and is the longest cable-stayed bridge in Romania and the widest such bridge in Europe; upon completion, traffic on the Grant Bridge and in the Gara de Nord area became noticeably more fluid.

Water 
Although it is situated on the banks of a river, Bucharest has never functioned as a port city. Other Romanian cities such as Constanța and Galați serves as the country's main ports. Works on the canal were suspended in 1989, but proposals have been made to resume construction as part of the European Strategy for the Danube Region.

Culture 

Bucharest has a growing cultural scene, in fields including the visual arts, performing arts, and nightlife. Unlike other parts of Romania, such as the Black Sea coast or Transylvania, Bucharest's cultural scene has no defined style, and instead incorporates elements of Romanian and international culture.

Landmarks 

Bucharest has landmark buildings and monuments. Perhaps the most prominent of these is the Palace of the Parliament, built in the 1980s during the rule of Communist dictator Nicolae Ceaușescu. The largest Parliament building in the world, the palace houses the Romanian Parliament (the Chamber of Deputies, and the Senate), as well as the National Museum of Contemporary Art. The building boasts one of the largest convention centres in the world.

Another landmark in Bucharest is Arcul de Triumf (The Triumphal Arch), built in its current form in 1935 and modelled after the Arc de Triomphe in Paris. A newer landmark of the city is the Memorial of Rebirth, a stylised marble pillar unveiled in 2005 to commemorate the victims of the Romanian Revolution of 1989, which overthrew Communism. The abstract monument sparked controversy when it was unveiled, being dubbed with names such as 'the olive on the toothpick' (măslina-n scobitoare), as many argued that it does not fit in its surroundings and believed that its choice was political.

The Romanian Athenaeum building is considered a symbol of Romanian culture and since 2007 has been on the list of the Label of European Heritage sites. It was built between 1886 and 1888 by the architect Paul Louis Albert Galeron, through public funding.

InterContinental Bucharest is a high-rise five-star hotel near University Square and is also a landmark of the city. The building is designed so that each room has a unique panorama of the city.

House of the Spark (Casa Scânteii) is a replica of the Lomonosov Moscow State University. This edifice, built in the characteristic style of the large-scale Soviet projects, was intended to be representative of the new political regime and to assert the superiority of the Communist doctrine. Construction started in 1952 and was completed in 1957, a few years after Stalin's death in 1953. Popularly known as Casa Scânteii ('House of the Spark') after the name of the official gazette of the Central Committee of the Romanian Communist Party, Scânteia, it was made for the purpose of bringing together under one roof all of Bucharest's official press and publishing houses. It is the only building in Bucharest featuring the Hammer and Sickle, the Red Star and other communist insignia carved into medallions adorning the façade.

Other cultural venues include the National Museum of Art of Romania, Grigore Antipa National Museum of Natural History, Museum of the Romanian Peasant, National History Museum and the Military Museum.

Visual arts 

In terms of visual arts, the city has museums featuring both classical and contemporary Romanian art, as well as selected international works. The National Museum of Art of Romania is perhaps the best-known of Bucharest museums. It is located in the royal palace and features collections of medieval and modern Romanian art, including works by sculptor Constantin Brâncuși, as well as an international collection assembled by the Romanian royal family.

Other, smaller, museums contain specialised collections. The Zambaccian Museum, which is situated in the former home of art collector Krikor H. Zambaccian, contains works by well-known Romanian artists and international artists such as Paul Cézanne, Eugène Delacroix, Henri Matisse, Camille Pissarro, and Pablo Picasso.

The Gheorghe Tattarescu Museum contains portraits of Romanian revolutionaries in exile such as Gheorghe Magheru, ștefan Golescu, and Nicolae Bălcescu, and allegorical compositions with revolutionary (Romania's rebirth, 1849) and patriotic (The Principalities' Unification, 1857) themes. Another impressive art collection gathering important Romanian painters, can be found at the Ligia and Pompiliu Macovei residence, which is open to visitors as it is now part of the Bucharest Museum patrimony.

The Theodor Pallady Museum is situated in one of the oldest surviving merchant houses in Bucharest and includes works by Romanian painter Theodor Pallady, as well as European and oriental furniture pieces. The Museum of Art Collections contains the collections of Romanian art aficionados, including Krikor Zambaccian and Theodor Pallady.

Despite the classical art galleries and museums in the city, a contemporary arts scene also exists. The National Museum of Contemporary Art (MNAC), situated in a wing of the Palace of the Parliament, was opened in 2004 and contains Romanian and international contemporary art. The MNAC also manages the Kalinderu MediaLab, which caters to multimedia and experimental art. Private art galleries are scattered throughout the city centre.

The palace of the National Bank of Romania houses the national numismatic collection. Exhibits include banknotes, coins, documents, photographs, maps, silver and gold bullion bars, bullion coins, and dies and moulds. The building was constructed between 1884 and 1890. The thesaurus room contains notable marble decorations.

Performing arts 

Performing arts are some of the strongest cultural elements of Bucharest. The most famous symphony orchestra is National Radio Orchestra of Romania. One of the most prominent buildings is the neoclassical Romanian Athenaeum, which was founded in 1852, and hosts classical music concerts, the George Enescu Festival, and is home to the George Enescu Philharmonic Orchestra.

Bucharest is home to the Romanian National Opera and the I.L. Caragiale National Theatre. Another well-known theatre in Bucharest is the State Jewish Theatre, which features plays starring world-renowned Romanian-Jewish actress Maia Morgenstern. Smaller theatres throughout the city cater to specific genres, such as the Comedy Theatre, the Nottara Theatre, the Bulandra Theatre, the Odeon Theatre, and the revue theatre of Constantin Tănase.

Music and nightlife 

Bucharest is home to Romania's largest recording labels, and is often the residence of Romanian musicians. Romanian rock bands of the 1970s and 1980s, such as Iris and Holograf, continue to be popular, particularly with the middle-aged, while since the beginning of the 1990s, the hip hop/rap scene has developed. Hip-hop bands and artists from Bucharest such as B.U.G. Mafia, Paraziții, and La Familia enjoy national and international recognition.

The pop-rock band Taxi have been gaining international respect, as has Spitalul de Urgență's raucous updating of traditional Romanian music. While many neighbourhood discos play manele, an Oriental- and Roma-influenced genre of music that is particularly popular in Bucharest's working-class districts, the city has a rich jazz and blues scene, and to an even larger extent, house music/trance and heavy metal/punk scenes. Bucharest's jazz profile has especially risen since 2002, with the presence of two venues, Green Hours and Art Jazz, as well as an American presence alongside established Romanians.

With no central nightlife strip, entertainment venues are dispersed throughout the city, with clusters in Lipscani and Regie.

Cultural events and festivals 

A number of cultural festivals are held in Bucharest throughout the year, but most festivals take place in June, July, and August. The National Opera organises the International Opera Festival every year in May and June, which includes ensembles and orchestras from all over the world.

The Romanian Athaeneum Society hosts the George Enescu Festival at locations throughout the city in September every two years (odd years). The Museum of the Romanian Peasant and the Village Museum organise events throughout the year, showcasing Romanian folk arts and crafts.

In the 2000s, due to the growing prominence of the Chinese community in Bucharest, Chinese cultural events took place. The first officially organised Chinese festival was the Chinese New Year's Eve Festival of February 2005, which took place in Nichita Stănescu Park and was organised by the Bucharest City Hall.

In 2005, Bucharest was the first city in Southeastern Europe to host the international CowParade, which resulted in dozens of decorated cow sculptures being placed across the city.

In 2004, Bucharest imposed in the circle of important festivals in Eastern Europe with the Bucharest International Film Festival, an event widely acknowledged in Europe, having as guests of honour famous names from the world cinema: Andrei Konchalovsky, Danis Tanović, Nikita Mikhalkov, Rutger Hauer, Jerzy Skolimowski, Jan Harlan, Radu Mihăileanu, and many others.

Since 2005, Bucharest has its own contemporary art biennale, the Bucharest Biennale.

Traditional culture 

Traditional Romanian culture continues to have a major influence in arts such as theatre, film, and music. Bucharest has two internationally renowned ethnographic museums, the Museum of the Romanian Peasant and the open-air Dimitrie Gusti National Village Museum, in King Michael I Park. It contains 272 authentic buildings and peasant farms from all over Romania.

The Museum of the Romanian Peasant was declared the European Museum of the Year in 1996. Patronised by the Ministry of Culture, the museum preserves and exhibits numerous collections of objects and monuments of material and spiritual culture. The Museum of the Romanian Peasant holds one of the richest collections of peasant objects in Romania, its heritage being nearly 90,000 pieces, those being divided into several collections: ceramics, costumes, textiles, wooden objects, religious objects, customs, etc.

The Museum of Romanian History is another important museum in Bucharest, containing a collection of artefacts detailing Romanian history and culture from the prehistoric times, Dacian era, medieval times, and the modern era.

Religion 

Bucharest is the seat of the Patriarch of the Romanian Orthodox Church, one of the Eastern Orthodox churches in communion with the Patriarch of Constantinople, and also of its subdivisions, the Metropolis of Muntenia and Dobrudja and the Archbishopric of Bucharest. Orthodox believers consider Demetrius of Basarabov to be the patron saint of the city.

The city is a centre for other Christian organizations in Romania, including the Roman Catholic Archdiocese of Bucharest, established in 1883, and the Romanian Greek-Catholic Eparchy of Saint Basil the Great, founded in 2014.

Bucharest also hosts six synagogues, including the Choral Temple of Bucharest, the Great Synagogue of Bucharest and the Holy Union Temple. The latter was converted into the Museum of the History of the Romanian Jewish Community, while the Great Synagogue and the Choral Temple are both active and hold regular services.

A mosque with a capacity for 2,000 people was in the planning stages at 22–30 Expoziției Boulevard. The project was later abandoned.

Architecture 
The city centre is a mixture of medieval, neoclassical, Art Deco, and Art Nouveau buildings, as well as 'neo-Romanian' buildings dating from the beginning of the 20th century and a collection of modern buildings from the 1920s and 1930s.  The mostly utilitarian Communist-era architecture dominates most southern boroughs. Recently built contemporary structures such as skyscrapers and office buildings complete the landscape.

Historical architecture  

Of the city's medieval architecture, most of what survived into modern times was destroyed by communist systematization, fire, and military incursions. Some medieval and renaissance edifices remain, the most notable are in the Lipscani area. This precinct contains notable buildings such as Manuc's Inn (Hanul lui Manuc) and the ruins of the Old Court (Curtea Veche); during the late Middle Ages, this area was the heart of commerce in Bucharest. From the 1970s onwards, the area went through urban decline, and many historical buildings fell into disrepair. In 2005, the Lipscani area was restored.

To execute a massive redevelopment project during the rule of Nicolae Ceaușescu, the government conducted extensive demolition of churches and many other historic structures in Romania. According to Alexandru Budișteanu, former chief architect of Bucharest, 'The sight of a church bothered Ceaușescu. It didn't matter if they demolished or moved it, as long as it was no longer in sight'. Nevertheless, a project organised by Romanian engineer Eugeniu Iordăchescu was able to move many historic structures to less-prominent sites and save them.

The city centre has retained architecture from the late 19th and early 20th centuries, particularly the interwar period, which is often seen as the 'golden age' of Bucharest architecture. During this time, the city grew in size and wealth, therefore seeking to emulate other large European capitals such as Paris. Much of the architecture of the time belongs to a Modern (rationalist) Architecture current, led by Horia Creangă and Marcel Iancu.

In Romania, the tendencies of innovation in the architectural language met the need of valorisation and affirmation of the national cultural identity. The Art Nouveau movement finds expression through new architectural style initiated by Ion Mincu and taken over by other prestigious architects who capitalise important references of Romanian laic and medieval ecclesiastical architecture (for example the Mogoșoaia Palace, the Stavropoleos Church or the disappeared church of Văcărești Monastery) and Romanian folk motifs.

Two buildings from this time are the Crețulescu Palace, housing cultural institutions including UNESCO's European Centre for Higher Education, and the Cotroceni Palace, the residence of the Romanian President. Many large-scale constructions such as the Gara de Nord, the busiest railway station in the city, National Bank of Romania's headquarters, and the Telephones Company Building date from these times. In the 2000s, some historic buildings in the city centre underwent restoration. In some residential areas of the city, particularly in high-income central and northern districts, turn-of-the-20th-century villas were mostly restored beginning in the late 1990s.

Communist era architecture 

A major part of Bucharest's architecture is made up of buildings constructed during the Communist era replacing the historical architecture with high-density apartment blocks – significant portions of the historic centre of Bucharest were demolished to construct one of the largest buildings in the world, the Palace of the Parliament (then officially called the House of the Republic). In Nicolae Ceaușescu's project of systematization, new buildings were built in previously historical areas, which were razed and then built upon.

One of the singular examples of this type of architecture is Centrul Civic, a development that replaced a major part of Bucharest's historic city centre with giant utilitarian buildings, mainly with marble or travertine façades, inspired by North Korean architecture. The mass demolitions that occurred in the 1980s, under which an overall area of eight square kilometres of the historic centre of Bucharest were levelled, including monasteries, churches, synagogues, a hospital, and a noted Art Deco sports stadium, changed drastically the appearance of the city.

Communist-era architecture can also be found in Bucharest's residential districts, mainly in blocuri, which are high-density apartment blocks that house the majority of the city's population. Initially, these apartment blocks started to be constructed in the 1960s, on relatively empty areas and fields (good examples include Pajura, Drumul Taberei, Berceni and Titan), however with the 1970s, they mostly targeted peripheral neighbourhoods such as Colentina, Pantelimon, Militari and Rahova. Construction of these apartment blocks were also often randomised, for instance some small streets were demolished and later widened with the blocks being built next to them, but other neighbouring streets were left intact (like in the example of Calea Moșilor from 1978 to 1982), or built in various patterns such as the Piața Iancului-Lizeanu apartment buildings from 1962 to 1963.

There is also communist architecture that was built in the early years of the system, in the late 1940s and 1950s. Buildings constructed in this era followed the Soviet Stalinist trend of Socialist Realism, and include the House of the Free Press (which was named Casa Scînteii during communism).

Contemporary architecture 

Since the fall of communism in 1989, several communist-era buildings have been refurbished, modernised, and used for other purposes. Perhaps the best example of this is the conversion of obsolete retail complexes into shopping malls and commercial centres. These giant, circular halls, which were unofficially called hunger circuses due to the food shortages experienced in the 1980s, were constructed during the Ceaușescu era to act as produce markets and refectories, although most were left unfinished at the time of the revolution.

Modern shopping malls such as the Unirea Shopping Centre, Bucharest Mall, Plaza Romania, and City Mall emerged on pre-existent structures of former hunger circuses. Another example is the conversion of a large utilitarian construction in Centrul Civic into a Marriott Hotel. This process was accelerated after 2000, when the city underwent a property boom, and many communist-era buildings in the city centre became prime real estate due to their location. Many communist-era apartment blocks have also been refurbished to improve urban appearance.

The newest contribution to Bucharest's architecture took place after the fall of communism, particularly after 2000, when the city went through a period of urban renewaland architectural revitalizationon the back of Romania's economic growth. Buildings from this time are mostly made of glass and steel, and often have more than 10 stories. Examples include shopping malls (particularly the Bucharest Mall, a conversion and extension of an abandoned building), office buildings, bank headquarters, etc. 

During the last ten years, several high rise office buildings were built, particularly in the northern and eastern parts of the city. Additionally, a trend to add modern wings and façades to historic buildings has occurred, the most prominent example of which is the Bucharest Architects' Association Building, which is a modern glass-and-steel construction built inside a historic stone façade. In 2013, the Bucharest skyline enriched with a 137-m-high office building (SkyTower of Floreasca City Centre), the tallest building in Romania. Examples of modern skyscrapers built in the 21st century include Bucharest Tower Centre, Euro Tower, Nusco Tower, Cathedral Plaza, City Gate Towers, Rin Grand Hotel, Premium Plaza, Bucharest Corporate Centre, Millennium Business Centre, PGV Tower, Charles de Gaulle Plaza, Business Development Centre Bucharest, BRD Tower, and Bucharest Financial Plaza. Despite this vertical development, Romanian architects avoid designing very tall buildings due to vulnerability to earthquakes.

Aside from buildings used for business and institutions, residential developments have also been built, many of which consist of high-rise office buildings and suburban residential communities. An example of a new high rise residential complex is Asmita Gardens. These developments are increasingly prominent in northern Bucharest, which is less densely populated and is home to middle- and upper-class Bucharesters due to the process of gentrification.

Education 

Overall, 159 faculties are in 34 universities. Sixteen public universities are in Bucharest, the largest of which are the University of Bucharest, the Politehnica University of Bucharest, the Bucharest University of Economic Studies, the Carol Davila University of Medicine and Pharmacy, Technical University of Civil Engineering, the National University of Political Studies and Public Administration, and the University of Agronomic Sciences and Veterinary Medicine of Bucharest.

These are supplemented by nineteen private universities, such as the Romanian-American University. Private universities, however, have a mixed reputation due to irregularities.

In the 2020 QS World University Rankings, from Bucharest, only the University of Bucharest was included in the top universities of the world. The Politehnica University disappeared from the ranking. Also, in recent years, the city has had increasing numbers of foreign students enrolling in its universities.

The first modern educational institution was the Princely Academy from Bucharest, founded in 1694 and divided in 1864 to form the present-day University of Bucharest and the Saint Sava National College, both of which are among the most prestigious of their kind in Romania.

Over 450 public primary and secondary schools are in the city, all of which are administered by the Bucharest Municipal Schooling Inspectorate. Each sector also has its own Schooling Inspectorate, subordinated to the municipal one.

Media 

The city is well-served by a modern landline and mobile network. Offices of Poșta Română, the national postal operator, are spread throughout the city, with the central post office located at 12 Matei Millo Street. Public telephones are located in many places and are operated by Telekom Romania, a subsidiary of Deutsche Telekom and successor of the former monopoly Romtelecom.

Bucharest is headquarters of most of the national television networks and national newspapers, radio stations and online news websites. The largest daily newspapers in Bucharest include Evenimentul Zilei, Jurnalul Național, Cotidianul, România Liberă, and Adevărul, while the biggest news websites are HotNews (with English and Spanish versions), Ziare.com, and Gândul. During the rush hours, tabloid newspapers Click!, Libertatea, and Cancan are popular for commuters.

A number of newspapers and media publications are based in House of the Free Press, a landmark of northern Bucharest, originally named Casa Scânteii after the Communist Romania-era official newspaper Scînteia. The House of the Free Press is not the only Bucharest landmark that grew out of the media and communications industry. Palatul Telefoanelor ('The Telephone Palace') was the first major modernist building on Calea Victoriei in the city's centre, and the massive, unfinished communist-era Casa Radio looms over a park a block away from the Opera.

English-language newspapers first became available in the early 1930s and reappeared in the 1990s. The two daily English-language newspapers are the Bucharest Daily News and Nine O' Clock; several magazines and publications in other languages are available, such as the Hungarian-language daily Új Magyar Szó.

Observator Cultural covers the city's arts, and the free weekly magazines Șapte Seri ('Seven Evenings') and B24FUN, list entertainment events. The city is home to the intellectual journal Dilema veche and the satire magazine Academia Cațavencu.

Healthcare 

One of the most modern hospitals in the capital is Colțea that has been re-equipped after a 90-million-euro investment in 2011. It specialises in oncological and cardiac disorders. It was built by Mihai Cantacuzino between 1701 and 1703, composed of many buildings, each with 12 to 30 beds, a church, three chapels, a school, and doctors' and teachers' houses.

Another conventional hospital is Pantelimon, which was established in 1733 by Grigore II Ghica. The hospital had in its inventory a house for infectious diseases and a house for persons with disabilities.

Other hospitals or clinics are Bucharest Emergency Hospital, Floreasca Emergency Clinic Hospital, Bucharest University Emergency Hospital, and Fundeni Clinical Institute or Biomedica International and Euroclinic, which are private.

Sports  

Football is the most widely followed sport in Bucharest, with the city having numerous club teams, including, most notably, Steaua București, Dinamo București, and Rapid București.

Arena Națională, a new stadium inaugurated on 6 September 2011, hosted the 2012 Europa League Final and has a 55,600-seat capacity, making it one of the largest stadiums in Southeastern Europe and one of the few with a roof.

Sport clubs have formed for handball, water polo, volleyball, rugby union, basketball and ice hockey. The majority of Romanian track and field athletes and most gymnasts are affiliated with clubs in Bucharest. The largest indoor arena in Bucharest is the Romexpo Dome with a seating capacity of 40,000. It can be used for boxing, kickboxing, handball and tennis. 

Bucharest hosted annual races along a temporary urban track surrounding the Palace of the Parliament, called Bucharest Ring. The Bucharest City Challenge race hosted FIA GT, FIA GT3, British F3, and Logan Cup races. Since 2009, Bucharest has the largest Ferrari Shop in Eastern Europe and the 2nd largest in Europe after Milan shop.

The capital also hosted the international tennis tournaments WTA Bucharest Open and ATP Romanian Open. Ice hockey games are held at the Mihai Flamaropol Arena, which holds 8,000 spectators. Rugby games are held in different locations, but the most modern stadium is Arcul de Triumf Stadium, which is also home to the Romanian national rugby team.

Bucharest hosted the UEFA Euro 2020 championship at the Arena Națională or Bucharest National Arena. The championship took place in 2021, being postponed due to the outbreak of the COVID-19 pandemic.

People 

 

 Costache Aristia (1800–1880), actor, writer, schoolteacher, revolutionary and philanthropist
 Nicolae Crețulescu (1812–1900), medical doctor and politician, second Prime Minister of Romania following the assassination of Barbu Catargiu; one of the first presidents of the Romanian Academy
 Constantin Bosianu (1815–1882), law professor and head of the Senate, Prime Minister of Romania and first dean of the Faculty of Law in Bucharest
 C. A. Rosetti (1816–1885), writer, politician and leader of the Wallachian Revolution of 1848; the Romanian Academy was founded on his initiative
 Ion Ghica (1816–1897), economist, engineer, mathematician, writer, revolutionary, diplomat and Prime Minister of Romania
 Dimitrie Ghica (1816–1897), army officer, police prefect, politician, mayor of Bucharest and Prime Minister of Romania
 Nicolae Bălcescu (1819–1852), historian, writer, soldier and leader of the Wallachian Revolution of 1848
 Nicolae Filimon (1819–1865), novelist and short-story writer, author of the first Realist novel in Romanian literature
 Dora d'Istria (1828–1888), writer
 Petre Ispirescu (1830–1887), folklorist and publicist
 Alexandru Odobescu (1834–1895), archaeologist, author and politician
 Ștefan Fălcoianu (1835–1905), army general who served as Chief of the Romanian General Staff and War Minister.
 Ioan Kalinderu (1840–1913), law professor, writer, silviculturist, confidant of King Carol I and head of the Romanian Academy
 Ion I. Câmpineanu (1841–1888), politician, mayor of Bucharest and the first head of the National Bank of Romania
 Emanoil Protopopescu-Pake (1845–1893), law professor, police prefect and politician, mayor of Bucharest
 Alexandru Macedonski (1854–1920), poet, writer and literary critic
 Barbu Ștefănescu Delavrancea (1858–1918), writer, poet, lawyer and mayor of Bucharest
 Nicolae Filipescu (1862–1916), politician, mayor of Bucharest
 Gheorghe Marinescu (1863–1938), founder of the Romanian School of Neurology
 Elena Văcărescu (1864–1947), writer and twice laureate of the French Academy
 Dragomir Hurmuzescu (1865–1954), physicist and inventor
 Vintilă Brătianu (1867–1930), construction engineer, mayor of Bucharest and Prime Minister of Romania
 Nicolae Paulescu (1869–1931), medical doctor, physiologist and the discoverer of insulin
 Ion Gheorghe Duca (1879–1933), politician and Prime Minister of Romania
 Tudor Arghezi (1880–1967), poet and writer
 Traian Lalescu (1882–1929), mathematician
 Mateiu Caragiale (1885–1936), poet and prose writer, illegitimate child of Ion Luca Caragiale
 Viorica Agarici (1886–1979), nurse and philanthropist, Righteous Among the Nations
 George Topîrceanu (1886–1937), poet, short story writer and humourist.
 Henri Coandă (1886–1972), aviation pioneer, inventor, the builder of world's first jet powered aircraft (Coandă-1910) and the discoverer of the Coandă effect
 Jacob L. Moreno (1889–1974), psychiatrist, leading social scientist, founder of psychodrama and foremost pioneer of group psychotherapy
 Edward G. Robinson (1893–1973), actor of stage and screen during Hollywood's Golden Age
 Catherine Caradja (1893–1993), aristocrat and philanthropist
 Mihail Andricu (1894–1974), composer, violinist, and pianist
 Camil Petrescu (1894–1957), writer, poet and philosopher
 Marcel Janco (1895–1984), visual artist, architect and art theorist, co-inventor of Dadaism
 Clara Haskil (1895–1960), classical pianist
 Marthe, Princess Bibesco (1886–1973), writer and poet
 George Călinescu (1899–1965), literary critic
 Mircea Eliade (1907–1986), historian of religion, writer and philosopher
 Haralamb H. Georgescu (1908–1977), modernist architect
 Șerban Țițeica (1908–1985), physicist, the child of Gheorghe Țițeica; head of the Romanian Academy
 Vazken I of Bucharest (1908–1994), Catholicos of All Armenians, National Hero of Armenia
 Richard Wurmbrand (1909–2001), Christian minister
 Maria Tănase (1913–1963), singer and actress
 Corneliu Coposu (1914–1995), politician and communist detainee
 Gică Petrescu (1915–2006), singer and composer
 Gellu Naum (1915–2001), surrealist writer
 Neagu Djuvara (1916–2018), historian, diplomat, law professor, writer and philosopher, nephew of Alexandru Djuvara
 Dinu Lipatti (1917–1950), pianist and composer
 Angelica Rozeanu (1921–2006), one of the most successful female table tennis players in the history of the sport
 Horia Damian (1922–2012), painter and sculptor
 Liviu Ciulei (1923–2011), theatre and film director, film writer, actor, educator, and costume and set designer
 Dinu C. Giurescu (1927–2018), historian and politician, son of Constantin C. Giurescu
 Nicolae Herlea (1927–2014), opera singer, baritone
 Draga Olteanu Matei (b. 1933), film and stage actress
 Victor Rebengiuc (b. 1933), film and stage actor, activist
 Gheorghe Dinică (1934–2009), actor
 Mircea Albulescu (1934–2016), film and stage actor, professor, journalist, poet and writer
 Cristian Țopescu (1937–2018), sports commentator, journalist and politician
 Gheorghe Gruia (1940–2015), handball player and twice world champion, named Greatest Handball Player of All Time by the International Handball Federation (IHF)
 Margareta Pâslaru (b. 1943), actress and singer
 Cristian Gațu (b. 1945), former handball player, twice winner of the World Championship with Romania and twice winner of the European Champions Cup with Steaua București
 Mircea Lucescu (b. 1945), former football player and coach, European Coach of the Year
 Ilie Năstase (b. 1946), tennis player and the first World No. 1, International Tennis Hall of Famer
 Florea Dumitrache (1948–2007), football player and twice winner of the Romanian Footballer of the Year award
 Andrei Pleșu (b. 1948), philosopher and essayist
 Corneliu Vadim Tudor (1949–2015), poet, writer, journalist and politician
 Dudu Georgescu (b. 1950), football player and twice winner of the European Golden Shoe
 Anghel Iordănescu (b. 1950), former football player and coach, and winner of the European Cup
 Dan Petrescu (1953–2021), businessman and billionaire
 Mircea Cărtărescu (b. 1956), writer, poet and literary critic
 Michael Crețu (b. 1957), singer, songwriter, and producer, founder of Enigma
 Mircea Geoană (b. 1958), former politician and Deputy Secretary General of NATO
 Cristian Diaconescu (b. 1959), diplomat
 Octavian Morariu (b. 1961), President of Rugby Europe
 Maia Morgenstern (b. 1962), film and stage actress
 Laura Badea-Cârlescu (b. 1970), fencer, Olympic, World and European champion in foil, International Fencing Hall of Famer
 Bogdan Aurescu (b. 1973), lawyer, diplomat and politician
 Rukmini Callimachi (b. 1973), New York Times journalist
 Theodor Paleologu (b. 1973), historian, diplomat and politician, son of Alexandru Paleologu
 Roxana Mărăcineanu (b. 1975), former swimmer, first French world champion, politician and the Minister of Youth and Sports of France
 Ion Oncescu (b. 1978), prolific arm wrestler, hall of famer
 Alexandra Maria Lara (b. 1978), actress
 Ana Maria Popescu (b. 1984), fencer, Olympic, World and European champion, former World No. 1 in épée
 Cristina Neagu (b. 1988), handball player, has a record four IHF World Player of the Year awards

Twin towns – sister cities 

Bucharest is twinned with:

 Amman, Jordan
 Ankara, Turkey
 Atlanta, United States
 Athens, Greece
 Beijing, China
 Chișinău, Moldova
 Damascus, Syria
 Kyiv, Ukraine
 Lagos, Nigeria
 Moscow, Russia
 Nicosia, Cyprus
 Pretoria, South Africa
 Sofia, Bulgaria
 Tbilisi, Georgia

In addition, Bucharest has a partnership with:
 Yerevan, Armenia (2013)

See also 
 List of buildings in Bucharest

References

Works cited

Further reading 
 Modern history of Bucharest, City Hall of Bucharest
 Șerban Cantacuzino, Două Orașe Distincte. Revista Secolul XX 4/6 (1997): 11–40
 Ernie Schoffham, Luminița MacHedon, Șerban Cantacuzino, Romanian Modernism: The Architecture of Bucharest, 1920–1940
 Romania: Arts & Architecture, Romanian Tourist Office
 Tatiana Murzin, Romanian Education , 2005
 Romanian Education Portal, Site for the Ministry of Education containing lists of all educational establishments.
 Bucharest, the small Paris of the East, on the Museums from Romania web site.
 Bucica, Cristina.  , 2000.

External links 

 Bucharest: Official administration site

 
Capitals in Europe
Cities in Romania
Capitals of Romanian counties
Localities in Muntenia
Market towns in Wallachia
Holocaust locations in Romania
1459 establishments in the Ottoman Empire
Populated places established in the 1450s
1968 establishments in Romania
States and territories established in 1968